Vandread Extra Stage is a light novel containing a collection of five short stories about several important characters from the anime Vandread. The book is set in the same story as the anime, however some of the stories are set before and after the series.

Plot summaries

Barnette & Jura Story

This is the first and longest story in the book. Taking place before the series begins, the story mainly focuses on the relationship between Jura and Barnette, starting from when Barnette joins the pirates. They later engage in a battle with the men of Taraak and bond following a crash.

Parfet Story

This story takes place after the episode "Mission". Parfet was trying to fix a shuttle, but then a bug from the main system of Mission infected the systems of the Nirvana. With most of the main crew (i.e. Magno, BC, Meia etc.) on the Mission and Parfet outside of the Nirvana in the shuttle all by herself, the 3 bridge operators Amarone Slangeba, Bervedale Coco and Celtic Midori must try to fix the system, and Parfet must contact Nirvana before the Emergency Life Support System goes off.

Gascogne Story

A short story set during the fight between the Mejere Pirates and the Reaping Machine in the Second Stage. It describes what happened after Gascogne had crashed her Delivery Ship into the Reaping Machine and after she went back to Nirvana following the last battle.

Kalua Story

This is a post-Vandread story about Ezra's daughter Kalua, that also prominently features Misty. After Hibiki and the others departed to Tarak, Pyoro somehow sneaked back to the Pirates Base because of "his" desire to see "Pyoro-2", much to the distress of Rebecca, Kalua's Ouma. Meanwhile, Misty was stressed too, because she felt she didn't belong with the pirates since she's not from Mejere and Meia was trying to help by suggesting Misty to join the Event-planning crew, who are planning a welcome party for when Hibiki would return with the men from Taraak. At the same time, Ezra, Rebecca and Pyoro find out Kalua is missing...but Misty manages to find Kalua and because of how pleased both Ezra and Rebecca are, they have Misty be Kalua's godmother.

Hibiki & Dita Story

Finally arriving on Tarak, BC and the other officials in Tarak were starting to plan for what to do during their trip. At the same time, they have encountered another problem about Hibiki. Since Hibiki is Grandpa and Grandma's child, the officials didn't know whether they should treat Hibiki as a diplomat or as the prince of their planet. In order to find out the answer, they wanted Hibiki to meet Grandpa and Grandma. Hibiki himself was also confused by the treatment he received from the officials and in great stress. The story closes when Hibiki and Dita get married and have a baby.

See also

 Vandread
 List of Vandread episodes

Kadokawa Sneaker Bunko
Light novels